Norwood Young America is a city in Carver County, Minnesota, United States, located about 40 miles west of Minneapolis. The population was 3,549 at the 2010 census.

History
Young America was platted in 1856. Norwood was platted in 1872.

Norwood Young America was formed on January 1, 1997 when Norwood and Young America merged. The city has been called by the abbreviation NYA, but is often simply called either Norwood or Young America.

Geography

Demographics

2010 census
As of the 2010 census, there were 3,549 people, 1,389 households, and 954 families living in the city. The racial makeup of the city was 95.2% White, 0.4% African American, 0.2% Native American, 0.5% Asian, 2.4% from other races, and 1.2% from two or more races. Hispanic or Latino of any race were 4.1% of the population.

There were 1,389 households, of which 35.9% had children under the age of 18 living with them, 53.1% were married couples living together, 10.5% had a female householder with no husband present, 5.0% had a male householder with no wife present, and 31.3% were non-families. 25.6% of all households were made up of individuals, and 11.7% had someone living alone who was 65 years of age or older. The average household size was 2.55 and the average family size was 3.05.

The median age in the city was 35.8 years. 27.2% of residents were under the age of 18; 7.3% were between the ages of 18 and 24; 28.3% were from 25 to 44; 25.8% were from 45 to 64; and 11.5% were 65 years of age or older. The gender makeup of the city was 49.5% male and 50.5% female.

2000 census

As of the census of 2000, there were 3,108 people, 1,171 households, and 833 families living in the city. The racial makeup of the city was 98.10% White, 0.13% African American, 0.45% Native American, 0.42% Asian, 0.51% from other races, and 0.39% from two or more races. Hispanic or Latino of any race were 2.64% of the population.

There were 1,171 households, out of which 40.5% had children under the age of 18 living with them, 58.2% were married couples living together, 8.5% had a female householder with no husband present, and 28.8% were non-families. 24.2% of all households were made up of individuals, and 11.7% had someone living alone who was 65 years of age or older. The average household size was 2.65 and the average family size was 3.19.

In the city, the population was spread out, with 29.4% under the age of 18, 9.9% from 18 to 24, 31.0% from 25 to 44, 18.0% from 45 to 64, and 11.7% who were 65 years of age or older. The median age was 33 years. For every 100 females, there were 93.9 males.  For every 100 females age 18 and over, there were 92.9 males.

The median income for a household in the city was $46,152, and the median income for a family was $54,792. Males had a median income of $36,292 versus $26,837 for females. The per capita income for the city was $18,431.  About 2.7% of families and 5.6% of the population were below the poverty line, including 4.7% of those under age 18 and 8.2% of those age 65 or over.

Notable People
 Stanley Wolfenden (Woodworker)
 Zachary Wolfenden (Sim Racer)

Politics

Business
In 1973, the Dile Corporation moved to Young America, and changed its name to Young America Corporation. It is one of the town's largest employers, processing rebate, coupon, and other marketing programs for businesses. It receives a great deal of mail, enough that this small town has over 20 ZIP codes. A main one is 55555.

The town has a main junction of the Twin Cities and Western Railroad, which connects with its wholly-owned subsidiary, the Minnesota Prairie Line, just east of downtown.

National Register of Historic Places gallery
Norwood Young America has several buildings listed on the National Register of Historic Places.

Arts and culture
Norwood Young America is home to Stiftungsfest, Minnesota's oldest festival (dating to 1861).

References

External links
 City website
 Stiftungsfest
 Central Public Schools

Cities in Carver County, Minnesota
Cities in Minnesota
Populated places established in 1997
1997 establishments in Minnesota